Brenda Mock Kirkpatrick Brown (born June 21, 1978) is an American college basketball coach.

Career
She was previously the head coach of the University of North Carolina at Asheville women's basketball team from 2012 to 2020. Brenda, now going by her married name, Mock Brown, was named head coach at East Tennessee State on August 8, 2022.

As a student-athlete, Mock graduated from Tuscola High School in 1996. She went on to obtain a Bachelor of Arts degree in history and sociology in 2000 and a Master of Arts in education in 2001 from Wake Forest University, while playing for the Demon Deacons.

Head coaching record

References

Source:

Living people
Georgia Tech Yellow Jackets women's basketball coaches
People from Waynesville, North Carolina
UNC Asheville Bulldogs women's basketball coaches
Florida Gators women's basketball coaches
Charlotte 49ers women's basketball coaches
Wake Forest Demon Deacons women's basketball players
American women's basketball coaches
1978 births
East Tennessee State Buccaneers women's basketball coaches